Dzerzhinsky City District is an administrative district (raion), one of the 10 raions of Novosibirsk, Russia. The area of the district is 36,51 km2 (14.10 sq mi). Population: 174,360 (2018 Census).

History
In 1933, the Dzerzhinsky District was established.

In 1980, part of the Dzerzhinsky City District became the Kalininsky City Distinct.

Geography

Bodies of water
 Kamenka River

Architecture

Soviet architecture

Parks

Beryozovaya Roshcha
Beryozovaya Roshcha is a park, established in 1963. Its area is 30 hectares.

Dzerzhinsky Park

Science and education

Research Institutes
 Chaplygin Siberian Scientific Research Institute Of Aviation

Educational institutions
 Novosibirsk Construction and Assembly College
 Novosibirsk Radio Engineering College
 College of Light Industry and Service
 Kondratyuk Aerospace Lyceum

Libraries
 Chklov Library
 Gashek Library
 Gogol Library
 Ostrovsky Library
 Tsvetayeva Library
 Turgenev Library

Culture

Cultural organizations
 Children's House of Culture named after Kalinin
 Eurasia (concert and theatrical center)
 Palace of Culture named after Chkalov
 Tochmashovets House of Culture

Dance
 Fraules Dance Centre is a dance school of Elena Yatkina.

Sports
 Chkalovets Stadium
 Novosibirsk Biathlon Complex is a sports complex in the east of the district.

Economy

Companies
 Novosibirsk Aircraft Production Association. Its produces Su-34 fighter-bombers, An-38-120 regional passenger aircraft. The company also involved in the Sukhoi Superjet 100 program.
 Maskulo is a fetish clothing company for men founded in 2014.

Transportations

Bus and trolleybus

Tram

Railway
Novosibirsk-Vostochny Railway Station is located in the district.

Metro
Two Novosibirsk Metro stations are located in the district: Beryozovaya Roshcha and Zolotaya Niva.

References